Matt Sherry (born December 11, 1984 in Hinsdale, Illinois) is a former American football tight end. He was drafted by the Bengals in the sixth round of the 2008 NFL Draft. He played college football at Villanova.

External links
Cincinnati Bengals bio
Villanova Wildcats bio

1984 births
Living people
American football tight ends
Bishop Hendricken High School alumni
Cincinnati Bengals players
People from Hinsdale, Illinois
Players of American football from Illinois
Sportspeople from Cook County, Illinois
Sportspeople from DuPage County, Illinois
Villanova Wildcats football players